(née Niiya, 17 October 1937 - 23 February 2013) was a Japanese anthropologist who specialized in the Islamic world.

Early life 
Born in Nara Prefecture in Japan, she moved to Kanagawa Prefecture and finished high school in 1956. She was admitted to Tsuda College as an English Language major and studied abroad during her senior year to graduate in 1962. She earned her Master of Letters in 1968 at the Chuo University Graduate School, and conducted research at Columbia University between 1971 and 1972 as a Visiting Research Fellow.

Islamic world and multicultural studies 
Katakura's main field of study was focused on the Islamic world including bedouin, and multicultural studies. In late 1960s she visited bedouin camps in Saudi Arabia for her first field research in Islamic culture, while the Katakuras lived there.
Abdur-Rahim Al Aḥmadī was the best supporter for Katakura's field work in Saudi Arabia since the early stage of her research in late 1960s. He witnessed that Katakura went into the nomad society of Wadi Fatima (western Saudi Arabia) and lived among those people for a period, and she visited them several times over the years. Katakura proceeded on-site research while winning the trust and affection of those people, observing the cultural heritage of their society.
Working as a lecturer at her alma mater Tsuda College between 1973 and '74, she obtained PhD. of Geology at Graduate School of University of Tokyo, faculty of Science in 1974. Promoted as an associate professor, she continued working at Tsuda College, and her hard work and tenacity on research and field work was rewarded when she published the survey results in her first book under the title of "Bedouin Village" in 1977.
She appreciated the contribution and support Abdur-Rahim Al Ahmadi had offered her, and asked him writing the preface to the Arabic version of that title.

Among academic circles 
With thorough academic papers followed the first book, she proofed that scientific values and her challenges in cultural anthropology was confirmed. Katakura started to extend the basis of her research during and after her tenure as a lecturer at University of Tokyo between 1975 and 1977, that Katakura gave lectures at International Christian University for the term of 1975/76 and 1977/78. Her teaching career extended at Tsuda College in 1978 to 1981. At the National Ethnographic Museum in Osaka she researched the Islamic world and multicultural studies including bedouin and desert culture in 1981 to 1993 at National Museum of Ethnology as a professor, where she became a professor emeritus in later years.

For multiculture studies, she actively researched abroad on many offers such as a visiting professor at University of British Columbia (1985 - 1986), a Visiting Research Fellow at Research Center for Arabian Literature (1987 - 1988). Coming back to Japan, she was a professor at the Graduate University for Advanced Studies (1989 - 1993). Kunio Katakura was appointed the Ambassador to Iraq and spent years over there during the early part of Gulf War. In Japan, in May 1990, the Japanese Association of Arid Land Studies was founded with Katakura as the first vice director.
It was in 1993 when Katakura professed at Chuo University at the Faculty of Policy Studies which started the same year, before she was nominated and became the director of the International Research Center for Japanese Studies in May 2005. The director of that Center had been succeeded from Takeshi Umehara to Hayao Kawai and Tetsuo Yamaori, all who were past professors at the center, and Katakura filled her post as the first woman  director without former tenure with them. Following her retirement in 2008, she became a professor emeritus at the center.

Episodes 
She was married to Kunio Katakura and lived overseas as a wife of a diplomat. In the United States of America, they made acquaintance with Hisashi Owada who was also a diplomat, and she recalled many times that she and her husband met his daughter Masako, the future Crown Princess of Japan during those years. During the early part of the Gulf War, she was on her research in Japan, while her husband was appointed in Iraq.

Katakura applied hiragana transcription when she got married and changed her family name to Katakura. A fortune teller advised Katakura that there were no problem to apply kanji to both her first and maiden name, or Motoko Shintani. However, the combination of both her first name and married name in kanji did not show good omen. Based on that advice, she transcribed her first name in kana rather than in kanji. On the first day at the National Museum of Ethnology as a professor, it was not quite comfortable for her to find her name inscribed in kanji only on the nameplate to her office, as she confessed in her essay.

Katakura Motoko died on 23 February 2013 at the age of 75.

Motoko Katakura Foundation for Desert Culture 
To honor Katakura Motoko's passion for her research, Motoko Katakura Foundation for Desert Culture was inaugurated on 7 November 2013, with her husband Katakura Kunio as the Councilor chairperson. The Nagahamas had met Katakura in 1990, and she had encouraged them over the years and left a will to include them as a recipient.

Awards and prizes 
1980 Award for the Promotion of Studies on Developing Countries, Institute of Developing Economics, Japan External Trade Organization
 1981 the first Kakami Kinen Zaidan Yushu Tosho Sho (Kakami Foundation Book Prize for Literature)
 1983 the sixth Sekiyu Bunka Sho (Petroleum Culture Award)
 1984 the third Esso Kenkyu Shorei Sho (Esso Research Promotion Award)
 1991 Daido Life Insurance Regional Studies Award

Committee membership 
 1965 - The Association of Japanese Geographers, Member
 1970 - Middle East Studies Association of North America (MESA), Member
 1970 - Society of Woman Geographers, Member
 1983 - British Society for Middle Eastern Studies, Member
 1985 - Japan Association for Middle Eastern Studies, Councilor, Director (1987)
 1987 - , Vice President (2002), Director (2005)
 1989 - The Japanese Association for Arid Land Studies, Vice President, Vice Director (1990)
 1989 - Collegium Mediterranistarum, Director, Vice President (1996).
 1991 - Japan Association for Nile-Ethiopian Studies, Director
 1992 - The Japanese Society of Ethnology, Councilor
 1997 – The Society for Near Eastern Studies in Japan, Director
 2005 − The Institute of Eastern Culture, Councilor

Affiliated academic societies 
 The Association of Japanese Geographers
 British Society for Middle Eastern Studies
 Collegium Mediterranistarum
 The Institute of Eastern Culture
Japan Association for Middle Eastern Studies 
 Japan Association for Nile-Ethiopian Studies
 The Japanese Association for Arid Land Studies
 The Japan Society for Comparative Study of Civilizations
 The Japanese Society of Ethnology
 Middle East Studies Association of North America (MESA)
 The Society for Near Eastern Studies in Japan
 Society of Woman Geographers

Projects 
"Challenges Facing Women", 1960

Yabaniya fi Wadi Fatima, Al-Madinat Al-Muhawwara Jidda, Saudi Arabia, 1969
Socio-economic Structure of Qura in Wadi Fatima, Kingkom of Saudi Arabian Government, 1970

 dissertation for PhD. Science, 1974.

Bibliography 
 With foreword by J. C. Hurewitz.

Notes

References 

1937 births
2013 deaths
Academic staff of Chuo University
Chuo University alumni
Columbia University fellows
Cultural anthropologists
Academic staff of International Christian University
Middle Eastern studies scholars
People from Nara Prefecture
Academic staff of Taisho University
Academic staff of Tokyo University of Foreign Studies
Tsuda University alumni
Academic staff of the University of British Columbia
University of Tokyo alumni
Academic staff of the University of Tokyo
Members of the Society of Woman Geographers